The Anjing railway station is a railway station on the Chengdu–Dujiangyan Intercity Railway and Chengdu West Ring Railway in Pidu District, Chengdu, Sichuan, China. This station has been fully built and some trains currently stop at Anjing. The oldname is Pixian Railway Station, the name change in 2010.

See also
Chengdu–Dujiangyan Intercity Railway

Stations on the Chengdu–Dujiangyan Intercity Railway
Stations on the Chengdu West Ring Railway
Railway stations in Sichuan